The South Korean boy band Astro has performed in eight concert tours (one of which has been worldwide), nine concerts, one fan meeting tour, thirteen showcases, and 64 other live performances since their debut in 2016.

Tours

Notes

References

External links

A
A
A
A
A